Business Spectator is an Australian business news website led by Alan Kohler as chairman and editor in chief. It is published by Australian Independent Business Media which is owned by News Corp Australia.

History
Business Spectator was launched on 30 October 2007. It was established by journalists Alan Kohler, Stephen Bartholomeusz, Robert Gottliebsen, and Eric Beecher, with financial backing from John Wylie and Mark Carnegie, and with a target audience of business people.

In 2014 a subscription system was introduced for the website, with columns by the main contributors placed behind a paywall.

References

External links
Business Spectator
Sydney Build Expo
AI Entrepreneur Finalists

Economics websites
News Corp Australia
Australian news websites
Internet properties established in 2007